Homero Ríos Murrieta (born 3 October 1974) is a Mexican politician affiliated with the National Action Party who was a member of the LIX Legislature of the Mexican Congress representing Sonora.

External links
 Perfil del legislador (in Spanish)

1974 births
Living people
21st-century Mexican politicians
People from Hermosillo
Politicians from Sonora
National Action Party (Mexico) politicians
Members of the Congress of Sonora
Deputies of the LIX Legislature of Mexico
Members of the Chamber of Deputies (Mexico) for Sonora